Batuli may refer to:
 Batuli, Ramshir, Iran
 Batuli, Punjab, India